Two Devils Will Talk is the ninth studio album by Canadian Celtic punk band The Real McKenzies. The album was released on 3 March 2017 by Fat Wreck Chords in the United States and by Stomp Records in Canada. Two Devils Will Talk was made available for streaming online a week before the physical release of the album.

Track listing

References 

The Real McKenzies albums
2017 albums
Fat Wreck Chords albums